Scapastathes violaceipennis is a species of beetle in the family Cerambycidae, and the only species in the genus Scapastathes. It was described by Stephan von Breuning in 1956.

References

Astathini
Beetles described in 1956
Monotypic beetle genera